Kosturino may refer to:

 Kosturino, Bulgaria
 Kosturino, North Macedonia